Muhammed Türkmen (born 9 April 1986) is a Turkish professional footballer. He currently plays as a midfielder.

Türkmen began his career with Altaş Soyaspor in 1999. He moved to Fenerbahçe in 2001, and played for the youth teams until 2005. İnegölspor signed him to his first professional contract on 22 August 2005. He spent two years with the club before moving to Kocaelispor. He has played for Orduspor, İstanbulspor, and Kartalspor since then. Türkmen moved to MKE Ankaragücü on 17 January 2011.

References

1986 births
Living people
Fenerbahçe S.K. footballers
İnegölspor footballers
Kocaelispor footballers
Orduspor footballers
İstanbulspor footballers
Kartalspor footballers
MKE Ankaragücü footballers
Turkish footballers
Süper Lig players
Turkey youth international footballers
People from Ulubey, Ordu
Association football midfielders